Apantesis allectans is a moth of the family Erebidae. It was described by Douglas C. Ferguson in 1985. It is found in the Mexican states of Durango and Sonora and the Chiricahua Mountains of southern Arizona in the United States. The habitat consists of open montane pine forests.

The length of the forewings is about 14 mm. The ground color of the forewings is dark brown, with buff to yellowish bands. The hindwings are orange red with a dark brown pattern. Adults are on wing from early May to late June.

This species was formerly a member of the genus Grammia, but was moved to Apantesis along with the other species of the genera Grammia, Holarctia, and Notarctia.

References

 

Arctiina
Moths described in 1985